The members of the First Dáil, known as Teachtaí Dála (TDs), were the 101 Members of Parliament (MPs) returned from constituencies in Ireland at the 1918 United Kingdom general election. In its first general election, Sinn Féin won 73 seats and viewed the result as a mandate for independence; in accordance with its declared policy of abstentionism, its 69 MPs refused to attend the British House of Commons in Westminster, and established a revolutionary parliament known as Dáil Éireann. The other Irish MPs — 26 unionists and six from the Irish Parliamentary Party (IPP) — sat at Westminster and for the most part ignored the invitation to attend the Dáil. Thomas Harbison, IPP MP for North East Tyrone, did acknowledge the invitation, but "stated he should decline for obvious reasons". The Dáil met for the first time on 21 January 1919 in Mansion House in Dublin. Only 27 members attended; most of the other Sinn Féin TDs were imprisoned by the British authorities, or in hiding under threat of arrest. The database of members of the Oireachtas (Irish parliament) includes for the First Dáil only those elected for Sinn Féin.

Elected in general election

Members by constituency

Changes

Vacancies
When the Sinn Féin executive met on 1 January 1919 to plan for the Dáil's inaugural meeting, it considered appointing substitutes for the imprisoned Sinn Féin TDs who would be unable to attend, but decided against this. When Pierce McCan died on 6 March 1919, his East Tipperary seat was left vacant at Westminster. In April 1919 a Dáil committee considering how to fill the vacancy considered allowing nomination by the Labour Party (which had stood aside in the 1918 election to avoid splitting the nationalist vote) before recommending that the Sinn Féin constituency organisation should nominate. However, in June 1919 the Dáil decided that "it was due to the memory of the late Pierce McCann that his place should not be filled at present". Later vacancies were also left unfilled; when Diarmuid Lynch resigned his seat in 1920, Arthur Griffith said "as the letter of resignation was addressed to the people of South-East Cork, the next step in the matter lay with the South-East Cork Executive of Sinn Fein".

Four TDs represented two separate constituencies: Éamon de Valera, Arthur Griffith, Eoin MacNeill and Liam Mellowes. Ordinarily, this would prompt them to choose one constituency to represent, and to move a writ for a by-election in the other constituency.

By-elections
The following Westminster by-elections to Irish seats were filled by Unionists who sat at Westminster.

See also
Historic Dáil constituencies

Notes

References

 
1st Dáil
01